Kristian Eriksen (born 18 July 1995) is a Norwegian football midfielder who plays for Molde.

He hails from Hamar. Eriksen played youth football for Vang FL before playing for the U17 and U20 teams of Hamkam. He made his senior debut in the 2014 1. divisjon against Nest-Sotra, and played most of the games in 2014, but with fewer games and no league goals in 2015 he was deemed surplus to requirements. In 2016 he moved on to Brumunddal and in 2018 to Elverum.

Elverum's 2020 3. divisjon was postponed and later cancelled because of the COVID-19 pandemic in Norway. Elverum was allowed to train, but without player contact. Eriksen's career having hit a dead end, he sent a text message to Hamkam, asking to train with the 1. divisjon team. "I have always been 100% and am more than willing to bleed for the childhood club", he wrote. The director of sports Espen Olsen received "thousands" of inquiries from players wanting to play on the Norwegian second tier, and left most of them unanswered, but decided to give the chance to this one former Hamkam player. While not impressing from his first training session, Eriksen underwent a rigorous individual training programme. Eriksen was eventually signed in September 2020, his contract only spanning the remainder of 2020. The season being postponed, Eriksen signed in time to play 15 league games.

His contract was renewed for 2021, and in the summer he had become the club's top goalscorer from midfield position, as Hamkam led the table. In October he reached double digits. Hamkam eventually won promotion.

His contract offer in 2021 entailed being fully professional. However, he chose to stay on a part-time basis in his former job as a children- and youth worker in Vestenga kindergarten. Eriksen dedicates goals to his deceased grandmother and father. His father died when Kristian Eriksen was 18 years old. He is also a grandnephew of Hamkam's all-time top goalscorer, Knut "Kula" Eriksen.

Career statistics

Club

Honours
Eliteserien: 2022

References

1995 births
Living people
Sportspeople from Hamar
Norwegian footballers
Hamarkameratene players
Elverum Fotball players
Eliteserien players
Norwegian First Division players
Association football midfielders